The Elizabeth Greenshields Foundation (formerly The Elizabeth T. Greenshields Memorial Foundation) is a private Canadian charity that provides grants to young artists working in representational painting, sculpture, drawing and/or printmaking. Recipients must be studying or in the early stage of their career.

History 
It was established in 1955 by the  Montreal lawyer Charles Glass Greenshields, Q.C. (1883-1974), in memory of his mother, Elizabeth T. Glass, to help young artists train in traditional artistic methods. It was endowed by Mr. Greenshields and does not solicit or receive external funding. By the terms of its endowment, it is precluded from funding the pursuit of abstract or non-objective art.

It received the Excellence in Fine Art Education Award from the Portrait Society of America in 2016 and the Gari Melchers Memorial Medal from the Artists’ Fellowship in 2021.

In 2021, The Elizabeth Greenshields Foundation awarded close to C $1.4M in grants to 86 artists and art students. Since its inception, it has granted some C $28M to over 2000 students and artists in more than 80 countries.

Notable grantees

References

External links 
 The Elizabeth Greenshields Foundation

Arts charities
Foundations based in Canada
1955 establishments in Canada